John E. Smith (August 4, 1843 Nelson, Madison County, New York – 1907) was an American politician from New York.

Life

Smith attended the district schools and Cazenovia Seminary, graduated from Albany Law School in 1867, was admitted to the bar the same year, and practiced in Morrisville.

Smith was district attorney of Madison County from 1878 to 1880, and in 1882; a member of the New York State Senate (23rd D.) in 1886 and 1887; and assistant United States Attorney for the Northern District of New York from July 1889 to July 1891.

On October 9, 1891, Smith was nominated on the 937th ballot by the Republican 23rd senatorial district convention, defeating the incumbent Titus Sheard, and was again a member of the State Senate in 1892 and 1893.

In March 1899, Smith was appointed as judge of Madison County, to fill a vacancy.

Smith is buried in the Morrisville Rural Cemetery.

Sources
The New York Red Book compiled by Edgar L. Murlin (published by James B. Lyon, Albany NY, 1897; pg. 403f)
New York State Legislative Souvenir for 1893 with Portraits of the Members of Both Houses by Henry P. Phelps (pg. 19)
PLATT CARRIES HIS POINT in NYT on October 10, 1891

External links

1843 births
1907 deaths
Republican Party New York (state) state senators
People from Madison County, New York
County district attorneys in New York (state)
Albany Law School alumni
New York (state) state court judges
People from Morrisville, New York
19th-century American politicians
19th-century American judges